There are many libraries of various types and affiliations in Seattle, a city in Washington state in the United States.

Organizations which list libraries
The Bill & Melinda Gates Foundation does research on libraries and is based in Seattle.  They create lists of libraries.

Libraries in Seattle

See also
 Books in the United States

References

External links
Washington state search for libraries
list of public libraries in Washington

Seattle
 
 
libraries in Seattle
libraries in Seattle
Libraries